In Megatokyo, the popular webcomic by Fred Gallagher, Japanese names are written in Japanese order, with the family name before the given name. The first feature of Megatokyo (a filler art day, referred to as a "dead piro day") which revealed a character's full name had aforementioned character's name written in Western order (given name before the family name). The first time a full Japanese name was mentioned in the actual comic, it was written with Japanese order.

Most of the characters in Megatokyo speak English, Japanese (indicated with angle brackets), and/or L33t (usually subtitled). Not every character speaks every language, so occasionally characters are unable to understand one another.

Protagonists

Piro
Piro (ぴろ) is Megatokyo's protagonist, an author surrogate of Fred Gallagher. Gallagher has stated that Piro is an idealized version of himself when he was in college.

As a character, he is socially inept and frequently depressed or morose; in addition, he is a fairly skilled artist who refuses to believe in his own talent—an exaggerated parallel of Gallagher himself. From a design standpoint, he was originally conceived as a parody of the character Ruri Hoshino, from the Martian Successor Nadesico anime series. Piro's facing of trials and tribulations as he struggles with his unconfident nature is one of Megatokyo's major ongoing themes. Piro is stated to have learned to speak Japanese through watching and reading large amounts of anime and manga.

Piro is drawn with shaggy-banged (fringed) blond hair, green eyes, and glasses throughout most of the comic. Piro has stated that without his glasses he cannot see especially well at any significant distance, although he did not wear them (as of Chapter 7-9) because Largo sat on and broken them, he coped with the situation quite well. This suggests that despite his near-sightedness, Piro can see reasonably well even without corrective lenses. Lately, Piro received both a new pair of glasses and a hair cut in Chapter 10, which makes him resemble the illustrated real life Fred more closely.

Initial panels depict Piro and Largo originally fleeing to Japan to escape the consequences of Largo's vulgar behavior while intoxicated at the E3 trade convention. Since arriving in Japan, he has been homeless twice, once after first arriving in Japan, and once after being evicted from his friend Tsubasa's flat. Homeless, he spent several nights in a park in downtown Tokyo. He and Largo spent months staying at Tsubasa's flat through his generosity, before Tsubasa (with the prompting of Ping, his PlayStation 2 accessory) left Japan for America. Piro's luck then improved when a game and manga shop, MegaGamers, mistakenly employed him. There he worked alongside Hayasaka Erika as a clerk and mascot. When his employer felt pity for his homelessness, under pressure from Erika he gave Piro and Largo board in MegaGamers' third-floor storage room.

Piro's feelings of insecurity cause him to have extreme difficulty understanding Megatokyo's female characters, and as such he does not realize the feelings the character Kimiko has for him. Early in the comic, he usually read shōjo manga to try to work out the "correct" way to deal with women and life in general. As he spends more time with Kimiko and other female characters, and more frequently heeds the advice of his "conscience enforcement agent," Seraphim, he comes to gain a deeper understanding of Kimiko's feelings, as well as gaining more self-confidence.

Gallagher has commented that, unlike Largo, who is the recipient of large amounts of the comic's physical damage, Piro is the focal point of emotional damage—an element exacerbated by his ability to converse with speakers of both English and Japanese, and his skill at understanding l33t.

The name "Piro" comes from Gallagher's online nickname, which was in turn taken from Makoto Sawatari's cat (named for Piroshki) in the Japanese visual novel Kanon.

Largo
Largo (ラルゴ) is the comic's secondary protagonist, and the comic version of co-creator Rodney Caston. He is an American video game fan who usually acts before (or instead of) thinking, thus providing the comic's primary source of humor. He is technically gifted, though in bizarre ways: he often uses beer as a CPU coolant,  and he often works on computer hardware in boxers (or completely nude) to avoid electrostatic discharge. He cannot pass up the opportunity to tamper with anything even remotely technological in nature, and is extremely skilled, building several computers for himself and Piro, and encouraging both his English class and Hayasaka Erika to also build computers.

Largo speaks fluent L33t, but no Japanese, relying on Piro and other bilingual characters to translate. In addition, he is obsessed with beer, and, fortunately for him, seems to have a superhuman tolerance for alcohol, at one point drinking over 100 cans of beer before passing out. He also seems to either have a remarkable healing ability or be subject to a form of cartoon physics, as he has suffered two broken arms and a broken leg since arriving in Tokyo, none of which caused much lasting ill effect. (However, Gallagher does comment in his first book that he consulted his wife, a physician, to determine how long Largo's arm would take to heal.) Largo is also an excellent fighter, and good at using what he can grab—while Erika was roaming the streets of Tokyo, he managed to run over Dom, a well-armed American friend of Largo's, with a muffin cart when Dom tried to threaten Erika. Using the same cart he ran over multiple fanboys (and also used a fake carrot while wearing a giant rabbit suit to beat some of them). Largo apparently still has the muffin cart, using it as his main source of transportation, as seen in strip 959 where Largo uses it to transport his computer equipment to Erika's apartment.

Largo often appears to be delusional, confusing reality with video games. As a result, he occasionally causes chaos and destruction as he battles against zombies and other (occasionally imagined) threats. However, because of the nature of the Megatokyo world, much of what Largo gets himself involved into is what really is happening. A good example is the battle against the undead swarm, which he describes while drinking at a Beer Garden, which he fought off with the help of Dom. While it's unclear how much of Largo's story is exaggeration and how much is truth, the Tokyo Police Cataclysm Division throws him in jail for being involved in the combat, proving that the battle did take place (and judging from Largo's amazing combat ability, he may really have fought off the entire horde). There is a possibility that Largo's story was actually his own version of what happened near the end of the first volume. After going down a manhole and finding "the long lost Book of Necrowombicon," he calls Dom to tell him he accidentally unleashed a horde of zombies. Then, Largo goes through Junpei's weapons, finds a crossbow, and goes to the Cave of Evil, which is actually a rave. He takes one look at the ravers and screams, "ZOMBIES!!!" After apparently firing the crossbow, he gets thrown in jail by the police. Then, Junpei (the "L33t N1nj4" and Largo's apprentice in l33t) arrives and summons a Rent-A-Zilla. A Godzilla-like creature busts through the building and Largo rides away on him. After Rent-A-Zilla destroys a few buildings, Largo gets off and meets up with Piro again. Conversely, Largo's obsession with gaming has led him to develop a number of remarkably profound concepts which guide his life, such as when one "plays" with others, they should support each other, not just "camp" and "snipe". Also, one shouldn't "play games"(seek out experiences) that aren't "worth playing"(provide enjoyment and fulfillment).

Early on in the comic, Largo somehow manages to get employed as an English teacher at Shiritsu Daitou High School, where Ping, Sonoda Yuki (at the attached middle school), and Tohya Miho attend, becoming "Great Teacher Largo" (a reference to the anime and manga GTO: Great Teacher Onizuka). He is extremely well liked by the students, and though Junpei has had to drag him to his job at various times, Largo is still a very respected and well-liked teacher, presumably due to his unorthodox style of teaching, which involves a great deal of shouting. His teaching style is based heavily in video games and computer knowledge; he once told the class, as homework, to make their "l4me" computers "l33t." He is popular enough that, when he was replaced with the actual new English teacher (Brad Grier of BioWare), the students rioted and spelled out "Great Teacher Largo" with the cafeteria tables.

He was also briefly employed by the Tokyo Police Cataclysm Division, but was removed from his position after failing to prevent the riot of Erika's fanboys.

Largo's opinion on women is divided. At times, he sees women as fair game, at other times as evil beings (especially Miho), which he believes Piro has a weakness to. In spite of this, he has developed a relationship of sorts with Hayasaka Erika.  He cares about Erika as a person; despite noticing her physical attractiveness, he shows a surprisingly deep and friendly side.

Once, when depressed over Erika's apparent rejection, he actually managed to become drunk at the "Cave of Evil" where Miho works. There, Miho attempted to seduce him, but Piro defended Largo fiercely, temporarily making Miho lose composure. During this time, Largo mentally described Piro as a "comrade." In a later comic, he is portrayed as both confused and unsettled, possibly even horrified, by Erika's (apparently spontaneous) flirtations.

In the current story arc, he again has fought the undead horde, but this time both Boo and Sonoda Yuki were by his side to help assist in the battle. Now he has gone to the Cave of Evil nightclub with Erika for unknown reasons, possibly looking for Tohya. While there, Erika makes him engage in a fight with Ed who was threatening Ping. Largo appears to be in his element right now.

The name "Largo" comes from Caston's online nickname, just as Gallagher is Piro.

The character of Largo (still managing to get in trouble with the law over his delusions of zombie armies) is also featured in Rodney Caston's own webcomic, Überclocked.

Largo's penchant for stripping naked to work on computers to avoid static discharge has been passed on to others. Erika, who has decided to build her own computer to "defend" herself on the Internet, now works on her computer while scantily clad, and tried to convince both Kimiko and Piro to do so (while both were in the house).

One of the recurring themes in Largo's storyline is that of a teacher. Largo has worked as a teacher for many characters, and almost despite himself, he is a source of inspiration to everyone he has taught. He currently mentors Junpei, his class, and now Erika, teaching them the way of "l33t".

His students in the class, while not really understanding most of what he's saying (a situation that has slowly been fixed throughout the comic), respect his energy and dedication. One of his students, Junko, who speaks English (and can, therefore, converse with Largo), told him that while he was a terrible English teacher, he did teach her to never give up. Likewise, Junpei believes that Largo has become so wise that it's made him strange- he views him as "eccentric". Erika's relationship with Largo is hard to define, but she does respect his skills with the computer to the point of listening to him.

All of this plays up one of the major themes of Megatokyo- while Piro is much more calm and collected, and Largo is very strange, it is Largo who has had the biggest effect on Japan so far. Fred Gallagher (as Piro) notes this inside and outside the strip, in his despair, stating that while he's the "expert" on women from the shōjo manga he used to read, it's Largo with the relationship; Largo, who as Piro states, doesn't know what to do, ends up doing all the right things anyway. These things reinforce Piro's poor image of himself- he doesn't realize that if he quit feeling like he's not worthy, he could do as well as Largo himself.

Hayasaka Erika
Hayasaka Erika (早坂 えりか) is Kimiko's roommate. She is a powerfully popular former Japanese idol and voice actress. Though she has been out of the direct spotlight for three years, she still has a considerable fan base; the merest sighting of her has caused riots among fans.

Erika is very strong-willed, confident, cynical, and hates being protected by others. She was once engaged to a man named Hitoshi, who, at the height of her career, claimed to believe that he was holding her back, and broke off their engagement. Erika was deeply hurt, and that event, combined with exposure to swarms of fanboys and possibly her periodic work as a "booth-babe" at fan conventions, has caused her to adopt a rather negative outlook on men, herself, and people in general. She became even more upset when it became obvious that Hitoshi had lied when he broke up with her and was selfishly thinking that she would be dangerous around his family (this belief that he is lying is proven to be true when he told Erika that Chief Inspector Sonoda didn't want her to come near the family and the Inspector told Erika that Hitoshi told him that she was nervous around children and wouldn't enjoy meeting the family).

She has made several shocking and cynical comments, once commenting that "All men are fanboys." She is powerful and firm, in direct contrast to Piro, Kimiko, and several other characters, all of whom are portrayed as unconfident. If anything, Erika shares Largo's problem of being too confident, her brashness against her fanboy riot resulting in Largo's firing from the police.

She is, in Junpei's words, "quite capable take care of self," being very strong, and apparently skilled in martial arts.

She works as a clerk and mascot at MegaGamers alongside Piro. She speaks Japanese and fluent English (and seems to understand L33t and hamster ). Recently, she has developed a relationship of sorts with Largo, his sheer bizarreness bypassing her "fanboy" prejudices and enabling her to notice his admirable qualities. They have developed an odd relationship, in some instances appearing to be merely a friendship, and in others something much more. Whatever the case, Erika enjoys teasing Largo at various moments.

Nanasawa Kimiko
Nanasawa Kimiko (七澤 希美子), Erika's roommate, is a Japanese girl who works as a waitress at an Anna Miller's restaurant. She is an aspiring voice actress who sometimes finds herself too shy or insecure to take on roles, but harbors beliefs on matters such as emotion and self-confidence with extreme conviction.

Kimiko is a kind, soft-spoken person in general, though she has a slightly impulsive nature. Her personality is somewhat similar to Piro's in that she has very little self-confidence and becomes extremely upset and flustered when she injures others, be it physically or emotionally. At the same time, she is prone to mood-swings, quite often causing herself embarrassment (and sometimes emotional harm to others) by saying things she does not mean. In addition, Kimiko has developed strong feelings for Piro, though she was at first too shy to admit them.

She speaks only Japanese, so she is unable to verbally communicate with Largo without an interpreter, although she has had some success directly influencing him nevertheless. Kimiko is extremely near-sighted, confessing to Piro that she can barely see at all without her contact lenses or glasses.

Kimiko has landed the role of Kannazuki Kotone (神無月 琴音) in the fictional dating sim Sight, and is earning herself an army of followers to rival even Erika's due to her rant on "Mumu-chan's" radio show, where she came to the defense of fanboys after being angered by the hosts' derisive comments about them. She has mixed feelings about being an idol. However, in comic 990 it is revealed that she has quit working on "Sight". Recently, she has told Miho that she wants to reclaim her job, since she doesn't want the fanboys to feel she "abandoned" them as well as she knows that if she doesn't work on "Sight", Kotone will never become alive. She found out that the project is in serious danger of being dropped, so she quickly agrees to go to a promotional event, in the hopes that her rejoining the project will give her boss better negotiation power. Recently, after the Sight project has been reaffirmed to be continuing, Kimiko has worked with Piro on his portfolio, attempting to get him to try to get a job drawing for Sight.

Ping
Ping (ピングちん Pingu-chan) is a robotic PS2 accessory, a non-H (non-hentai; platonic love only) test model of the new Sony-EDS (Emotional Doll System) that fell into Tsubasa's hands somehow.

Ping is designed to be used with dating sims, and, after playing them, develops her own personality based on the player's choices in the games. To date, she has never actually been used with a dating sim by her various owners, and as such seems to be developing her personality from real-world experiences instead. Although she is learning quickly, there are still times when she acts unrealistically. Her programming has primed her to care for socially inept otaku who have the money to buy an EDS to practice their fumbling dating techniques on.

Although she has revealed to Piro that she has feelings for him, the nature of their relationship is still not entirely clear. Lately, it seems like she has given up on having Piro see her as a potential love interest. When she sighted him and Kimiko dozing near the end of Chapter Eight, she didn't look or act jealous. On the contrary, she seemed to be endeared by the sight, and wished both characters a peaceful slumber. She speaks only Japanese, although she has the ability to have other language "modules" installed.

Due to problems with her prototype software, Ping does not handle rejection well and can be sent into a berserk rage when "rejected" by her human companions. Largo has triggered her rejection subroutine on two occasions so far,(comic #138,#368) once intentionally. When enraged, she has been known to use her incredible strength to pull telephone poles out of the ground to use as weapons, and at one point manages to hurl a gigantic turtle monster through the top of a skyscraper.

Her systems have displayed the ability to change her physical traits, including hair color (from gray to pink to blue-green and, most recently, to black) and bust size. Miho claimed that her changes also included height and hips and were caused by heartbreak from the events of chapter 6. After the change, Ping does not remember ever having been different. Also, later in the story, she deliberately changes her appearance several times in attempt to find her true self.

Miho befriended Ping and regularly spent time with her. She seems to be able to influence Ping's programming and personality by playing with her, although Miho's exact intentions with Ping are unknown. After Miho vanishes when Ed 'kills her', Ping begins desperately searching for her. However, when she returns to school to ask if anyone's seen Miho, nobody even remembers who Miho is except Junko. Junko reveals she once tried to be Miho's friend, but Miho apparently abandoned her similar to the way to abandoned Ping. Junko helps Ping locate Miho anyway by getting her to post pictures of Miho on the internet, and the two girls go down to The Cave of Evil where they witness Yuki bringing Miho there. 

Ping, like Junpei, appeared in an issue of Applegeeks, in which the main character explained his stressful situation (ironically, involving a robot girl) to her. Unfortunately, Ping, not speaking English, was unable to help.

Although Ping seems to have similarities to Chi from Clamp's Chobits, Fred has stated that "[He] did Ping before [he] ever saw Chobits." Instead, Ping is based more upon the general robot girl that appears in anime.

Tohya Miho
  is an enigmatic and manipulative goth girl of indeterminate age - while she goes to high school, she claims to be older than she looks. Over the course of Megatokyo, she proves to be highly intelligent, and adept at both arcade and role-playing video games. She is drawn to resemble a "Gothic Lolita" (a Japanese synthesis of goth and lolita subculture), and is often described as "darkly cute", with Gallagher occasionally defining her as a "perkigoth". Miho often acts strangely and regularly accomplishes abnormal feats, such as perching herself atop telephone poles. Despite these displays of power, Miho suffers from some sort of unnamed illness, which causes her to go into shock in Chapter 2. Miho speaks English and Japanese fluently and has no problem understanding L33t.

Miho knows Piro and Largo from the Endgames MMORPG previous to the plot of Megatokyo. Miho abused a hidden statistic in the game in order to control a large number of player characters, befriending and betraying Piro and Largo. In the game, she was a tall, handsome man (dubbed "Niho" by Megatokyo forum-goers) with the same ribboned hairstyle as the real-world Miho. She uses the username "m0h" when instant messaging.

Miho is also involved in Erika's back story. Miho's manipulation of Erika's unhappy fans after Erika's disappearance from the public sphere ended badly, with the TPCD cleaning up the aftermath and Miho hospitalized. As a result, Inspector Sonoda wants to keep Miho away from Yuki, his daughter. Miho has briefly hinted at Yuki's mother being involved in the incident as well.

Largo believes that Miho is undead, and in command of an army of zombies. Bizarrely, Largo might be correct in a different way: Largo has a recurring problem with recognizing fanboys of any kind as "zombies", and automatically reacts to them as such. Miho's past manipulation of Erika's fanboys could quite well be what Largo is speaking of when talking about her "zombie" army.

The events of the November 2006 strips put for the first time boundaries for these speculations, showing unambiguously that Miho is indeed capable of superhuman feats: she has been able to evade almost effortlessly both projectile and energy weapons used against her by Ed. In fact, Ed was at least in part aware of her abilities, and has been shown as genuinely frightened by Miho before: a most peculiar fact, as he never seemed to fear anybody else, even Ping, who has caused his person incredible damage (see below). Later, she personally noted and demonstrated similarities between herself and Yuki, suggesting that she too may be a type of magical girl.

It is hinted that Miho has some animosity with her classmates, particularly Junko. Recently, it was revealed by Junko that Junko and Miho used to be friends, but that Miho abandoned Junko the same way she apparently has abandoned Ping.

Miho's most common rival is Largo. Largo was the first person Miho met in the comic (after he opened the Cave of Evil, possibly suggesting that she was either trapped in it or was in some way helped by its opening), he is constantly following and challenging her, and she indirectly set him up with his job as "Great Teacher Largo" — he was attempting to follow her in "disguise" when the principal found him, assuming from the English conversation he was having that he was the new English teacher. The relationship between Miho and Largo is not always one of war and pure hatred; Largo displays a surprising honourable streak when Miho passes out in the school's bathroom. He went after her when he noticed her missing in class, and when he found her, he said that he would "not accept... an ending without honour." He had Junpei take her to the school infirmary (from which she was sent to a hospital), and thus may be indirectly responsible for saving her life — she was presenting symptoms of the mid-stages of shock.

Despite all this, Miho's "greatest" rival may well be Piro. Piro overcame her Endgames character despite her abuse of the system, defeating her and possibly expelling her from the game. Miho described Largo and Piro in real life as "one too much like I imagined", referring to Largo, and "the other completely different," referring to Piro, who played a brave, confident female character completely different from himself - someone she had an in-game relationship with.

She was originally never shown eating, despite describing herself as hungry several times and in odd situations, culminating in chapter 4 when she took Ping, Piro, and Largo to a bathhouse and for cake, claiming she was hungry when they arrived and full at the end (her uneaten cake pointedly displayed). Comic 897 finally breaks with this tradition, showing Miho taking a bite out of her waffle, proving that she does, in some respect, eat.

Later, Miho and Largo's war "escalated"; she attempted to seduce him at the Cave of Evil (revealed to be a nightclub) and since then, her efforts to either mock Largo or reduce him in stature have increased. When Largo attempted to get his entire class to take their clothes off in order to construct l33t computers without the risk of static discharge, Miho sarcastically said that Largo (who did not understand why any of the classmates would want to look at their female peers naked) only lusted after "machines" that let him live his "puffed up fantasies". This also led to Largo's admission of a "woman he was attracted to."

Ping believes Miho her to be a friend, although when Miho was hospitalized she claimed she was merely using Ping, possibly to influence Piro somehow or to further her own ends. Recently, she has revealed that she was aware of Yuki's nature as a magical girl. Miho seems to look out for Kimiko, rescuing her from a building shortly before Ed blows it up and trying to frighten Dom off when he tries to badger Kimiko to join his company (although Kimiko is the one who succeeds in driving off Dom, Miho is still able to collapse his car with one hand). Miho later hides Kimiko in the Cave of Evil and asks her why she allows the fanboys to "devour" her. Kimiko explains that she needs to work on the "Sight" project to make Kotone become alive. Miho seems touched at this and helps her get back to the "Sight" offices along with alerting Piro to everything that happened. She does, however, refuse to allow Piro to talk with Kimiko. She also shows concern when Kimiko becomes upset upon learning that the "Sight" project is in danger of being dropped.

Miho's family has not been seen in the comic. When she was in the school's nurse's office, the nurse attempted to call them without success, then mentions she can never get hold of them. Miho seems to spend most of her time at the Cave of Evil, possibly living there, and so is very close to the staff there. One of the employees told Piro that he was glad that Miho was being so playful and that she normally drove people away. He also mentioned that she was a "good girl" and that they almost lost her a while ago.

Miho was thought to be dead after a laser barrage was fired at her by Ed at the end of Chapter 9. In chapter 10, however, she is seen alive at a hospital where she is visited by Sonada Yuki. Yuki tries to convince Miho that people care for her, and have been worried about her- a fact Miho vehemently denies, saying they simply get a thrill out of 'playing' her. After Miho engages in a verbal war with Yuki, Yuki forcibly removes her from the room where she was staying, and takes her to the Cave of Evil. All the main characters except Piro are there, and are shocked to see her. After an eventful reunion, Miho attempts to return home, only to find a whole crowd of people outside. She then goes to Piro's apartment and falls asleep, greatly startling Piro when he returns home. She and Piro have an emotional argument, in which they discuss their past online relationship, among other things.

Seraphim
Seraphim (セラフィム Serafimu) is a miniature angel, about the size of an action figure. She takes the role of Piro's conscience, struggling to keep Piro on the straight and narrow, particularly when it comes to romantic attachments and other personal relationships. Seraphim is very concerned about Piro's attitude and goes to great lengths to keep him motivated towards going back to the United States. Seraphim is very pragmatic and quick to criticize, and her opinion of Piro's abilities is not high, probably reflecting Piro's own self-deprecating nature.

Seraphim speaks English, but, like Piro, understands Japanese.

She often requests more funding and resources from the Conscience Agency, but their only response thus far has been the assignment of Boo to her as an assistant. Apparently, she can make use of what she calls "Big Mode", which allows her to be the size of a human rather than her normal size. Earlier in MegaTokyo, Seraphim had a kitty assistant, but it died. According to Gallagher, that comic was to honor the memory of his wife's deceased cat.

She has at least one identical sister, as revealed in Chapter 5; described by Asmodeus as a "bad girl" and (so he claimed) his lover, though at the time Asmodeus seemed unaware that Seraphim had any siblings and simply assumed that the Seraphim he saw popping balloons and spilling a child's ice cream was the real thing.

This twin impersonated Seraphim for a time and influenced Piro in less than helpful ways. Once, she advised Piro to be pessimistic and not to waste his time trying to build a relationship with Kimiko; later she cheered him on, but also encouraged him to embrace his patheticness before she was promptly yanked away by the real Seraphim. As of June 2007, there has been no further appearance of this semi-evil twin and Fred has stated that he has no intent to bring her back in the foreseeable future.

Seraphim is modeled after Sarah Wooden, Gallagher's wife (girlfriend when Megatokyo began), who has a penchant for fine clothes and loves cats.  Also, she is now a mother as of 2009.

Boo
Boo (ブー Bū) is a hamster with strap-on wings, initially assigned to the role of Largo's conscience, a task made only harder by the fact that Boo cannot speak, but only squeak (occasionally in L33t, e.g. "squ34k"). Largo tends to think that Boo is always agreeing with him. As his character has developed under the influence of Largo, Boo has been known to communicate more often in writing. He seems to have trouble with technology, shown in a comic when he reports back to his superiors in post-it notes. Later he learns how to use grappling hooks, jet packs, and a catnip-mouse bazooka to rescue Seraphim from Belphegor.

Boo first appeared as a worker from a temp agency sent by the Conscience task force in response to one of Seraphim's repeated requests for aid. After rescuing Seraphim from Belphegor, he was promoted to a special agent in the Conscience task force. Boo didn't appear at all for most of Chapter 7, with the exception of one panel.

Boo is actually a reference of Minsc's "Miniature Giant Space Hamster," from the role-playing video game series Baldur's Gate, who occupies a space in Minsc's Quick Item slots. In one strip, Boo showed up at the display booth of BioWare, the company responsible for Baldur's Gate series, and unsuccessfully tried to get his old job back.

Boo is also known for the phrase stated by Largo, "Go for the beer, Boo!", a reference of one of Minsc's war cries, "Go for the eyes, Boo!".

Lately, it seems that other character may be able to see Boo as well- when Largo goes to The Cave of Evil with Erika, she compliments him on his hamster (Boo, who was sitting on Largo's hat). Recently, though Boo is seen alongside Largo in most strips, he hasn't spoken much, if at all.

Asmodeus
Asmodeus (アスモデウス Asumodeusu) is Piro's anti-conscience, sent by an organization referred to only as the "other agency." He tries to undo everything Seraphim does, going so far as to tempt Piro to fall in love with underaged girls. Despite this opposition to Seraphim, he coquets  her almost every time they meet (he has also hinted that he and Seraphim, or at least her twin sister, have had a relationship in the past), which usually results in her verbally and/or physically attacking him. She once dispatched him by flashing him in a trenchcoat. Asmodeus speaks English.

His partner is a vicious cat named Belphegor; appropriate as Asmodeus and Belphegor are both demons. Belphegor wears clip-on bat wings to make himself look demonic, just as Boo wears angel wings.

He has not appeared as of late.

He is a comic version of Ken Hashimoto, one of the Megatokyo forum's administrators and, at one point, a co-translator of the Japanese version of Megatokyo.

Junpei
Junpei (ジュンペイ) is Largo's apprentice, a l33t ninja. He seems to have near-superhuman abilities typical of an "anime ninja", such as being able to travel great distances over rooftops at high speed without being detected, and bending guns and various other weapons out of shape. Certainly, whatever role he fills seems to leave him with a fair amount of free time, and allows him to cultivate his artistic side — much like a traditional samurai. He is never seen without his mask, although Meimi Sonoda tells him that he is very handsome when she removes it (even then, he covers his lower face with his jacket).

He is introduced when Piro and Largo arrive in Japan, and Largo has no passport. A customs official tells Largo that, in order to get into Japan, he must defeat Junpei in "mortal combat". Largo, being unsurpassable in all matters electronic, easily wins the contest by defeating Junpei in a match on the Mortal Kombat arcade game. Junpei is deeply impressed by this, and the next time he meets Largo, Junpei apprentices himself to him in order to learn "the way of l33t" from Largo (whom Junpei calls "L33t Master"). However, this apprenticeship seems to consist largely of Junpei bailing Largo out of trouble, such as getting him out of jail, and fetching him when he forgets about the classes he teaches at Shiritsu Daitou.

He works for some sort of ninja organization that provides feed services. This includes Shiritsu Daitou hiring Junpei to take Largo to school. He can apparently call upon the services of "Rent-a-zillas" (extremely large, rentable, lizard-like creatures bearing resemblance to Godzilla). According to him, the Tokyo Police are in the same union as his organization (thus his breaking Largo out of jail would upset "the Grand Ninja Master"). The organization also seems to have some sort of hitman-like services, as they were mentioned by Dom to have won a contract that TPCD put out on Largo (according to Dom, the amount they work for is "almost insulting").

In the aftermath of the fanboy riot, Junpei is seen managing the stream of otaku coming to see Hayasaka Erika—reducing it to one per hour.

Junpei speaks Japanese, as well as poor but understandable English, omitting some words and always referring to himself in the third person; this trend can also be seen in his Japanese, as a joke playing on old, poorly dubbed ninja movies. Junpei also speaks L33t reasonably well.

Junpei has also appeared in the famous webcomic Applegeeks, where he saved the main characters from a horde of security guards. He can also be seen looking sadly at the plane taking two of the characters home, perhaps suggesting he developed a relationship with one of them.

Sonoda Yuki
Sonoda Yuki (園田 由紀) is a 15-year-old student at Shiritsu Daitou Attached Middle School. She is apparently a diligent student, and has earned the rather undesirable label of "Little Miss Perfect" from her friends. She has also been shown helping her friend Maimi with Geometry. Tohya and Ping are not in the same class as Yuki; she is younger than them, and referred to by several of Ping's classmates as "underclassman Yuki".

Yuki speaks Japanese, and can manage some basic (if fragmented) English.

She comes from a stable home. Her father, Inspector Sonoda Masamichi, is an officer of the Tokyo Police Cataclysm Division. Her mother, Sonoda Meimi, is now a housewife but was a magical girl during her youth. Yuki has a relatively normal relationship with her brother Yuuji — there is a lot of mutual antagonism between the two.

Yuki is taking art lessons from Piro, although it is a rare occurrence when these lessons actually occur when planned. In the past she has been shown to have some feelings for Piro, but often denies or misunderstands them. More recently it has been suggested that she may be developing feelings for her classmate Kobayashi Yutaka, although it remains to be seen if these feelings are romantic in nature; for his own part, Yutaka has had a crush on Yuki for a while according to Yuki's friends, but at least his mother would appear to approve.

Like her mother, she appears to be capable of stealing things without being aware of it (at one point she goes so far as admit to Largo that "all I good at is steal things"). This, and other unusual abilities she is suggested to have, imply that she is a magical girl of some sort too, as her mother. Her status as a magical girl was confirmed by her own actions and Miho's statements.

Yuki becomes friends with Ping after Yuki wants to return Piro's cell phone but is unable to do so because of a sprained ankle. Ping helps Yuki walk and even offers to carry her, telling Yuki "Don't give up, Sonoda-san! We'll find him!! We'll take the city apart if we have to!" Yuki later catches Ping being harassed by jealous schoolmates and tries to tell them to stop (this does little good, however, since the girls have no respect for underclassmen and ignore her more or less).

Miho and Yuki seem to form a shaky friendship also, when they speak on top of a telephone wire. Miho tells Yuki that Yuki is a magic girl and wishes her well. Yuki also remembers a time when she shoplifted and was nearly caught, but Miho lied to the police and told them that she hid the objects in Yuki's bag and was "using" her.

Yuki was then seen helping Largo find Piro. The two meet when a zombie horde attacks Tokyo and she nearly stops a group by throwing large appliances (including washing machines) at them. She is almost caught off-guard by one, but Largo rescues her by shooting it in the head. He then recognizes her magic girl skills (possibly familiar with magic girls because of Piro's tendency to read those comics and play those kinds of video games). She tells him that Piro went to find Kimiko in Ikeburo, which also happens to be on fire from the zombie attack. When Largo is unable to get a Rent-a-Zilla to take on the horde (as the store has a policy against renting them out during zombie attacks), Yuki tells Largo that her power is to steal things and manages to steal a 'Zilla and some pork rinds.

After Miho goes missing, Yuki begins searching for her, and firmly refuses to believe she is dead. She then steals Piro's old laptop and finds his old conversations with Miho on it, and uses them to go find her. She finds Miho in what appears to be hospital, and tries to convince Miho that people-namely Piro-do care about her. When Miho begins verbally baiting her, Yuki forcibly removes her from her room, and takes her to The Cave of Evil. All the main characters except for Piro are there, and they are all startled to see Miho.

Dom
Dom (ドム Domu) is an employee of Sega Black Ops, and Ed's best friend and rival. He possesses a seemingly endless supply of weaponry, as well as an unscrupulous personality. Early in the series, he is on a mission to appropriate Ping for Sega, before Ed is capable of carrying out his orders to recover or destroy her. However, after Sega leaves the console business, he seeks to acquire Hayasaka Erika (due to her power to influence the masses) as an asset for his company.

As with Ed, he often resorts to violence as a first course of action. However, unlike Ed, he is also quite capable of complex scheming, verbal persuasion and blackmail. Dom is the more focused of the duo, in that he thinks about and plans what to do before acting—unlike Ed, who is rather more trigger-happy.

Dom speaks English and Japanese and understands L33t quite well. He is the comic version of Dominic Nguyen, Fred Gallagher's associate and the creator of the infamous Shirt Guy Dom filler-strips. The character Dom is also a regular character in Okashina Okashi – Strange Candy (and has the same background as the Megatokyo incarnation), as Dominic is friends with Okashina Okashis current artist, Emily Snodgrass, and its former writer, Allison Brownlow. He is also in good terms with Fred Gallagher (Piro), Sarah Wooden (Seraphim), and Edmund Balan (Ed).

EdEd (エド Edo) is an employee of the Sony Enforcement Division, as well as Dom's best friend and rival. Like Dom, he seems to have an unlimited supply of guns, and a trigger-happy personality to match. Early in the comic, he is sent on a mission to capture or destroy Ping (a missing prototype belonging to Sony) before rival companies capture her, although his strange insistence on using extreme measures to do so often leads to his own injuries rather than hers.

After one encounter with Ping in which she hurls a gigantic turtle monster into the skyscraper Ed is standing on, Ed undergoes a plastic surgery which transforms him into a bishōnen. Later, during an attempt of Ed's to snipe Ping with an excessively large and powerful weapon, he is vaporized by an orbital laser strike and subsequently regrown in a growth tank from residual dust left behind after the incident, bearing yet another new face as a consequence. He presumably undergoes such extensive reconstruction again after being defeated in a fight with Miho, when his weapon malfunctioned and exploded with enough force to break windows at a distance.  However, he ultimately overcomes this setback and finally defeats Miho at the end of the Chapter 9, (apparently) killing her with a fitting yet excessive laser barrage.

Ed seems to suffer from at least partial insanity and is exceptionally sadistic. He derives pleasure from explosions, in particular. Despite his apparent lack of self-preservation instincts, he seems to be terrified of Miho, calling her "the real thing." He speaks both English and L33t.

His real life equivalent is Edmund Balan, Fred Gallagher's associate. The character Ed (with the same background and personality as his Megatokyo version) is also a regular in Okashina Okashi - Strange Candy, as Edmund is friends with Okashina Okashi's artist, Emily Snodgrass. He and Dominic Nguyen (Dom) are also friends in real life.

Other characters
In Megatokyo, many characters and groups exist outside what makes up the bulk of the main plot. Notably, Fred Gallagher has stated before that he does not believe in "minor characters," and that the characters depicted in Megatokyo are all main characters in their own lives, but he understands that he "can't follow every rabbit down every hole."

Below are some of the characters with smaller parts in Megatokyo's overall story than others, as well as the various groups to have surfaced thus far.

In Megatokyo, Japanese names are written in Japanese order, with the family name before the given name. The first feature of Megatokyo (a filler art day, referred to as a "dead piro day") which revealed a character's full name had aforementioned character's name written in Western order  (given name before the family name). The first time a full Japanese name was mentioned in the actual comic, it was written with Japanese order.

Tokyo Police Cataclysm Division
The "Tokyo Police Cataclysm Division" is a division of the Tokyo police force that monitors and ensures that riots, monster attacks, zombie hordes and other large disasters occur in an easy and manageable fashion. It is also responsible for scheduling said disasters. They use multiple high tech weapons, including such things as giant robots, orbiting laser satellites and giant lizards, though they often sport conventional weaponry.

Largo served a very brief stint as a member of the TPCD, until he was fired for failing to stop a horde of fanboys from swarming a store.

Sonoda Masamichi
Yuki's father, he is an often encountered employee of the Tokyo Police Cataclysm Division. Masamichi speaks fluent English and Japanese. He is related to Erika's past, as she was engaged to his brother Sonoda Hitoshi. He and Largo cross paths several times (due to Largo's wild attempts to save Tokyo from "zombie invasions") and temporarily makes Largo a member of the Tokyo Police Cataclysm Division, though he later takes back the license when Largo fails to stop a fanboy horde from finding Erika Hayasaka.

Sonoda Yuuji
Yuki's brother. He enjoys anime and video games (including eroges), and is a casual fan of Hayasaka Erika. He was the first person to confirm her presence at Megagamers, but did so only out of curiosity.

Sonoda Meimi
Yuki's mother. She is a retired magical girl, probably inspired by Meimi Haneoka, the title character in the anime Saint Tail.

She appears to watch over Erika in the way Junpei does Largo. Although she is not shown performing as impossible feats as Junpei often is (e.g. jumping out of an exploding airship), she is clearly a force to be reckoned with. In their first main encounter she not only surprises him, but picks his pocket without his noticing. Junpei seems familiar with her, and many times attempts to call her by her previous name.  Although something always prevents this, from the little of it he says (Mys-) it most likely involves the word "Mystery". Junpei is suspicious of Meimi and mentions her being involved in something that ended in destruction. This suspicion is somewhat odd, since Meimi seems very quiet and kind, even a little out-of-it (she seems to have a habit of forgetting to pay for objects).

She takes a contract to neutralize Largo (he is apparently viewed as a threat to the balance of Japan) after Junpei turns it down. When asked why, she responds "I have my reasons. As a mother, as a friend, and as a mentor." She is a mother to Yuki and a friend to Erika, but the "mentor" reference has never been explained. But when Miho is almost killed by Ed and Meimi feels her in pain has led to speculation that she was Miho's mentor when Miho first became a magical girl. While Junpei believes that the neutralization involves her killing Largo, Meimi insists that she can fulfill her contract simply by taking Piro and Largo to the airport and sending them out of the country.

Sonoda Hitoshi
Hitoshi was Erika's former fiancé. He is described as being a bit like Piro (boring, shy, etc.), in contrast to Erika who was "beautiful, popular and outgoing".  No one could understand why she dated him and in the end, he broke up with her, saying that he was holding her back. While talking to Largo, Erika realizes that Hitoshi was actually more selfish. After a pregnancy scare, he told Erika that she was dangerous to be around his niece and nephew (Yuki and Yuuji) and that his brother and sister-in-law (Misamachi and Meimi) were concerned about the "harm someone like [Erika] could do to their children". Because of this, Erika distanced herself from the Sonoda family and never tried to meet Yuki or Yuuji. It was later revealed that Hitoshi lied to Erika about his family's worries. Chief Inspector Sonoda told Erika that according to Hitoshi, she hated children and that if they invited her over, the children would make her uncomfortable. Because of this deception, Largo branded Hitoshi as a "bloodsucking l33ch".

Hayasaka Erika Fan Club (AKA "The Fanboy Horde")
A number of people obsessed with Hayasaka Erika, or at least her former persona as an idol and voice actress. The club rediscovers her whereabouts during the comic's story  when the GPS coordinates of her workplace were posted anonymously on a bulletin board (comic #445). Later claimed by Dom, In comic #616: "I started this operation to see what she can still do,". This then led to the entire club as well as hundreds of other fans swarming the MegaGamers store in order to get a glimpse of their idol and have her sign some memorabilia for them. This huge mob was then referred to by Largo as well as members of the Megatokyo Forums as "The Fanboy Horde" or simply as "The Horde", though Largo only sees the Horde as a group of zombies.

Nanasawa Protection Coalition
The Nanasawa Protection Coalition is a group that formed after Nanasawa became angry at a group of fanboys who were trying to use a camera to look up her skirt while she was working in the Anna Millers.  This caused a split between the otaku.  Some seemed to believe that there was nothing wrong with using her as a fantasy, while the rest felt bad that they upset her. A single fanboy later approached Nanasawa in MegaGamers and apologized for his and the other otaku's behavior.  In a later comic, when Miho helps Nanasawa escape from Dom in a restaurant, several fans attempt to swarm Kimiko, however, they are stopped by a person who asks them to leave her alone "In the name of the Nanasawa Protection Coalition". A member of the group named Sleepy Shadow has recently contacted Piro, telling him that they must meet about an important matter. They refer to Piro as "the protagonist". The official abbreviation for the group, as evidenced by the arm & headbands some of them wear, is NPC, which is also an abbreviation for Non-player character.

Rent-a-Zilla
Massive lizard hired by Junpei and the TPCD on occasion, paid in pork rinds (on an hourly rate). It is later revealed that the company that runs Rent-a-Zilla has a policy against renting out 'Zillas on Summer and Winter Comike, as well as during zombie invasions, possibly to prevent Rent-a-Zilla from turning into a Zombie, which later happens.  Sonoda Yuki, in turn, keeps it as a pet, after her mother has it shrunk.

Contrary to what some may think, the giant creature that goes on drunken rampages in Megatokyo is technically not a Rent-a-Zilla, but a relative of the giant turtle Gamera known as Gameru'. According to Inspector Sonodoa, he'd shown great promise early on, but later became an alcoholic and a bully.

Ph34rbots
Robots built by Largo out of parts salvaged from dumpsters, as well as the TPCD's own stealthy wall-mounted phones and soda dispensers that he co-opted. They are used for protecting Megagamers and its surroundings, or guarding the "spawn points" (sewer gratings). These have now been left around the city, as seen in one filler art day later on in the series.  Their effectiveness is minimal.

L33T d00d
Strange raver-esque person who appears occasionally - usually when Largo is playing arcade games - and gives advice in L33t, which is invariably translated into erudite language (i.e. "1'm4 0wnz0r j00" becomes "I shall defeat thee"). He owes Largo a debt of gratitude for saving his life He has an apparent heart or blood condition that requires him to take medication, and can send him into state of collapse if unattended. Because he needs help taking his pills in such an emergency, Largo has become a valuable ally as one of the few people that can understand him.  Strangely enough, he is able to speak English by the events of Chapter 3, where he spoke L33t until his last line in Largo's Super Moe-Moe Ball battle against Miho.  Whether he could always speak English or learned it while in Japan remains a mystery.

Teramoto Mami and Kurabayashi Asako
High school students and friends of Yuki's, and think she has a crush on Piro and they may be right. They use Yuki's possible attraction to Piro as an excuse to tease her. Asako is very energetic, loves teddy bears, and can be extremely annoying when she wants to get information out of Yuki. Mami is the more focused of the two and doesn't hesitate to use Asako's annoying traits to get information from Yuki.

Ibara Junko
The "angry schoolgirl" in Largo's class. She can speak English fluently and is usually the one who has something to say when Largo does something outrageous in his role as "teacher." She is one of the few students who can see through his cool façade. At one point, she helps Largo try to disperse the fanboy horde that threatens Erika and helps him recover after he and Erika have a fight. Junko has also defended Largo as a noble teacher after Miho declared him emotionally inept. Junko is involved in enjo kōsai, and is terrified at the thought of her parents discovering her activities. Her father is an alcoholic who sometimes asks her for money. Her mother was also shown recently, and she appears to be a normal mother who is concerned her daughter doesn't have enough friends. Junko was part of the group of girls who 'reprimanded' Ping, and tried to stop the other girls from 'going overboard'. There seems to be no actual animosity towards Ping motivating her actions, and she claims to be just giving her advice. When Ping reappears at school after a long absence, Junko notices she is trying to change herself to be what she thinks they want her to be, and tells her not to.

Junko has been shown much more of late, after she reveals she once seemingly tried to befriend Miho. However, Miho apparently abandoned her similarly to how she abandoned Ping, which is the cause of Junko's animosity towards Miho.

When Ping is searching for Miho, Junko is the one person at school who remembers Miho. She reveals their past friendship to Ping, and implies that Ping and Miho's relationship is just like theirs was. She decides to help Ping find Miho after deciding that it would 'greatly tick her off'. She introduces Ping to the social web, and gets her to post pictures and videos of Miho-some of which are very personal. Junko and Ping go to The Cave of Evil after Junko finds out her dad is there, looking for Miho. She and her dad have a discussion about Miho being the 'Real Thing', though what exactly that means is not stated. Junko is there when Yuki forcibly brings Miho to The Cave.

Tsubasa
A friend of Piro's from the Internet, Piro and Largo bunk with him when they wind up in Japan. He acquired Ping through unclear means in chapter 0; he said he had invested in the project, but Ed's actions would seem to suggest he wasn't supposed to take her. Later, he leaves Japan to "follow his heart" in America, leaving Ping in the care of Piro and Largo. Tsubasa is the comic's incarnation of Keishi Tada, Fred Gallagher's friend and primary consultant on all things Japanese. He writes the Japanese translation of Megatokyo. The character was written out of the story after Tada requested it, but he reappeared later via an instant message chat.

Yanagisawa
The manager of the MegaGamers store where Piro and Erika work. He is a heavy smoker and somewhat cynical, having had regular contact with the many fanboys that come into the store. He knows Erika's past, clearly cares about her, and is just as cowed by her as anyone else. He is usually referred to as "the boss" or "Boss-san".  Yanagisawa speaks limited English, causing problems when Largo fills in for Erika at work.

Matsui Takeshi
The producer of "Sight", the game in which Kimiko has her possible breakout voice acting role. He initially had reservations about hiring Kimiko because her interpretation of her character was different from the one he had planned, but he later becomes convinced of her talent. Despite this, she has been an extreme source of frustration, which culminated in her quitting her role after a fiasco at Anna Miller's. As a producer, he is very conscious of his budget and of public relations issues.

Ryoya Sayuri
The character designer of "Sight". It was she who convinced Matsui to hire Kimiko for the role of Kotone, arguing that her interpretation of the character made the game deeper than it would be otherwise. Sometimes her ideas conflict with Matsui's, and he usually respects her judgment (but not without grumbling). She also occasionally gives Kimiko advice on dealing with fame and relationships. Kimiko had her draw and sign a sketch of Kotone, as a gift to Piro.

Kobayashi Yutaka
Despite appearing in the backgrounds of several comics, looking at Yuki in the foreground, he went unnoticed by most readers until he had his first line. He did not interact with any other characters until strip 945, where he was thrust into the foreground. He attends Yuki's school and was one of the first people (after Tohya Miho and, arguably, Ping) to discover that Yuki was a magical girl. His name was revealed on March 6, 2007, in an extra chapter 8 page written for Megatokyo book 5, and his first name revealed on July 30, 2007.

He winds up in the hospital after Yuki falls off of a telephone wire and mildly injures him. Although he knew that it was Yuki that caused the injuries, he lies and tells everybody that he was actually hit by a car, to prevent Yuki from getting in trouble.   He is also very helpful to Yuki during the zombie attack late in the comic, communicating with Yuki through text messages. He appears to have a very large crush on Yuki, which she may reciprocate.

Waltah
A bartender at the bar where Miho works, Waltah is dressed like a butler. Specifically, his outfit, monocle, physical appearance, and name suggest he is a homage to Walter C. Dornez of Hellsing fame. 'Waltah' is the Japanese pronunciation of the English 'Walter'. He appears to be close friends with Miho (as most of the employees there are) and worries about her. He also helps take care of Kimiko when Miho brings her there for sanctuary after they escape a fanboy horde.

References

List of characters
Lists of webcomic characters